Odyssey of Iska is the fourteenth  album by American jazz composer and saxophonist Wayne Shorter, released on Blue Note Records in 1971. Musicians include guitarist Gene Bertoncini, bassists Ron Carter and Cecil McBee and drummer Billy Hart, along with multiple percussionists.

History and concept
Odyssey of Iska was the outcome of the second recording session with Shorter that was produced by Duke Pearson. (The first session, Moto Grosso Feio on April 3, 1970, was not issued until 1974.) With the exception of Ron Carter there was a completely different line-up, although with a similar instrumentation: Shorter's saxophone as the only horn, guitar instead of keyboards, two double bass players, and various percussion instruments including marimba and vibraphone. The same emphasis on percussion is also found on a recording date led by Joe Zawinul only some two weeks before, on August 10, where Wayne Shorter had a guest appearance on "Double Image" (released on Zawinul).

Wayne Shorter had just married Ana Maria Patricio, whom he had met four years earlier. The name "Iska" in the album title refers to their daughter. She was born around the time the record was made.

One of the percussionists on Odyssey of Iska, Frank Cuomo, is the father of rock group Weezer's frontman, Rivers Cuomo. The other drummers are Billy Hart and Alphonse Mouzon.

Reception 

The AllMusic review by Scott Yanow states "On the verge of joining Weather Report (referred to in the liner notes as "Weather Forecast"), it is not surprising that Shorter's originals include titles such as "Wind", "Storm", and "Calm". These moody works were never covered by other jazz players but they work quite well in this context, launching melancholy flights by Shorter."

Track listing 
All compositions by Shorter, except "Depois do Amor, o Vazio" written by Bobby Thomas.

"Wind" – 8:00
"Storm" – 8:22
"Calm" – 3:25
"Depois do Amor, o Vazio" (After Love, Emptiness) (Bobby Thomas) – 11:40
"Joy" – 9:00

Personnel 
 Wayne Shorter – tenor saxophone, soprano saxophone
 Gene Bertoncini – guitar
 Ron Carter, Cecil McBee – bass
 Billy Hart, Alphonse Mouzon – drums
 Frank Cuomo – drums, percussion
 David Friedman – vibraphone, marimba

References

External links 
 Wayne Shorter - Odyssey of Iska (rec. 1970, rel. 1971) album releases & credits at Discogs
 Wayne Shorter - Odyssey of Iska (rec. 1970, rel. 1971) album to be listened on Spotify

1971 albums
Wayne Shorter albums
Blue Note Records albums
Albums produced by Duke Pearson